Uppsala Reggae Festival is the largest reggae festival in Scandinavia. It has been active since 2001, with a number of notable artists performing. It was first held in 2001, but the name was used as early as 1995. Uppsala Reggae Festival attracts attendees of all ages from all over the world. In connection with the 2001 festival, Uppsala was given the epithet "The Reggae Mecca of Scandinavia" by the Swedish National TV4, on the grounds that the festival then was the only festival in Scandinavia specifically dedicated to reggae. The third Uppsala Reggae Festival was awarded that year's cultural award by Swedish National Radio Broadcasting, and the fourth festival featured the largest reggae lineup ever to play in Scandinavia. Starting in 2002, the festival was held in August each year in Uppsala, 70 km north of Stockholm until it relocated in 2012. In 2004, the festival settled down at its current venue, KAP, which is central and in the heart of the city. Both in 2004 and 2005, the festival had about 10,000 attendees. Moreover, in 2007, the festival had the most visitors recorded to date with approximately 24,000 patrons attending the festival.

In 2012, the festival moved to Gävle where it was held in 2012 and 2013. However, after a couple of years, the promoters decided to take a break and the festival was halted.

After a six year long hiatus, where the festival had left a big void in the city of Uppsala, it was announced in December 2016 that the festival would make a long-awaited comeback in 2017. 
The festival was held at the same venue as prior years, with the biggest change being that it only was one day, as opposed to the two or three days that had become the custom in the past.
In 2018 the festival came back with a bang, boasting with a two days and who is who in reggae line up with greats as, Jimmy Cliff, Alborosie, Tarrus Riley, Konshens, Protoje and many more.
2019 saw the festival returning to Fyrishov to the original venue where it once started out in 2001, with the best facilities that a festival can have, great lawn, super swimming pool and a children pool located central in Uppsala by the Fyris river and with the city's best camping site with among others 43 well equipped cottages to rent and enough space for caravans.

See also

List of reggae festivals
Reggae
Rastafari

References

External links
Uppsala Reggae Festival official Facebook page

Reggae festivals
Music festivals in Sweden
Music in Uppsala
Tourist attractions in Uppsala County
Music festivals established in 2001